Štiavnické Bane is a village in the Banská Štiavnica District, in the Banská Bystrica Region of Slovakia.

Name
First, in 1352 it was recorded as Sygluspergh, then in 1388 as Pergh, in 1457 as Sigelsperg, in 1559 as Pergh, later as Szélakna, Windschacht and then until 1891 as Pjerg, after Hegybánya. Slovaks used Piarg until 1948, after Štiavnické Bane. Recently, Germans use the form Siegelsberg, while Hungarians use Hegybánya.

Famous people
Štiavnické Bane was the birthplace of the 18th century astronomer Maximilian Hell and the controversial World War II politician Vojtech Tuka.

References

External links
http://www.obecstiavnickebane.sk

Villages and municipalities in Banská Štiavnica District